Statistics of Emperor's Cup in the 1955 season.

Overview
It was contested by 16 teams, and All Kwangaku won the championship.

Results

1st Round
All Rikkyo 4–0 Muroran Kiren
All Kansai University 4–1 Rokko Club
Matsuyama Club 0–5 Toyo Industries
Waseda University 2–2 (lottery) Chuo University Club
Nippon Light Metal 3–1 Yawata Steel
Keio BRB 2–3 Osaka Club
Tohoku Gakuin University 4–1 Meiji University
All Kwangaku 4–0 Toyama University Club

Quarterfinals
All Rikkyo 1–0 All Kansai University
Toyo Industries 0–1 Chuo University Club
日本軽金属 1–2 Osaka Club
Tohoku Gakuin University 0–7 All Kwangaku

Semifinals
All Rikkyo 1–2 Chuo University Club
Osaka Club 0–4 All Kwangaku

Final
 
Chuo University Club 3–4 All Kwangaku
All Kwangaku won the championship.

References
 NHK

Emperor's Cup
1955 in Japanese football